WASH complex subunit 2C is a protein that in humans is encoded by the WASHC2C gene. WASHC2C, also known as WASHCAP, VPEF, FAM21A, or FAM21C, expresses itself ubiquitously in bone marrow and thyroid tissues mainly as well as 25 other tissues. WASHC2C is intracellular and is mainly in the nucleoli, vesicles, and cytosol. The protein has a low immune cell, human brain regional, and a low tissue specificity. Some diseases that the protein are associated with are Vaccinia and Transient Tic Disorder.

Function of WASHC2C 
WASHC2C is part of the WASH core complex where it functions as a nucleation-promoting factor (NPF) at the surface of endosomes. Here it recruits and activates the Arp 2/3 complex to induce actin polymerization. Actin polymerization plays a key role in the fission of tubules that serve as transport intermediates during endosome sorting. WASHC2C also mediates the recruitment of F-actin-capping protein dimer to the complex as well as the recruitment of the core complex to endosome membranes via binding to phospholipids. The strongest phospholipid bonding the protein does is with phosphatidylinositol 4-phosphate, phosphatidylinositol 3,5-biphosphate and phosphatidylinositol 5-phosphate. The protein is also required for the endosomal recruitment of CCC, a multi-subunit protein complex, and other subunits such as COMMD1, VPS35L and CCDC93. WASHC2C is involved in several other processes, negative regulation of barned-end actin filament capping, fluid base endocytosis endosomal transport, and regulation of substrate adhesion-dependent cell spreading.

Structure 
The WASHC2C gene size is about 1320 amino acids with a molecular mass of 144911 Daltons (Da) or 144.911 Kilodaltons.(kDa) The protein has a quaternary structure and a basal isoelectric point of 4.66.

References

Further reading